The pale spotted catshark, Asymbolus pallidus, is a cat shark of the family Scyliorhinidae found only off Queensland, at depths of between 225 and 400 m. Its length is up to 44 cm.

References

 

Asymbolus
Fish described in 1999